TNT (formerly known as Piltel, Mobiline, Phone Pal, and still unofficially known as Talk 'N Text) is a cellular service of Smart Communications in the Philippines. By April 2000, Piltel launched its GSM brand, Talk 'N Text. Piltel also reported 16,590,737 subscribers to its GSM brand, Talk 'N Text, before its transfer to Smart. Piltel used the 912 area code for its AMPS/CDMA service. However, it is now used for TNT.

TNT is known for its low-cost packages, catering mostly to the mobile needs of the masses of the Philippines. From classics like Gaan Text 10 to unlimited offers like Unlitext Extra 30, TNT provides a wide range of offerings in call, text, mobile internet, and other value-added services.

Products and services
The brand provides multiple services in SMS, Voice, Combo, Net and Load Services. Some of the brand's SMS services such as UnliTxt2all 20 provides subscribers unlimited texts to all networks, or GaanTxt10 with 100 SMS to TNT/Smart + 10 SMS to all networks. There are voice services as well such as Sangkatutok15 which offers 2 days 20 minutes call to TNT/Smart subscribers. Combo offers are aimed to utilize SMS and voice in one package. Such promos as the Unlitxt extra 30 offers subscribers free texts to TNT/Smart numbers for 3 days plus 15 minutes of call to TNT/Smart. Some combos may have certain peak periods such as the Unlitalkplus20 which features unlimited calls to TNT/Smart from 10pm to 5pm and unlimited texts to TNT/Smart for the whole day. There are also internet plans for prepaid mobile devices such as AlwaysOn which offers 45MB of data for P20 or the Facebook Mobile App which allows subscribers to access via the Facebook mobile app on java phones. There are also load services such as the Alkansya which gives subscribers the option of saving up their load and Pasaload which gives them the service of sharing load with others.

TNT provides products aimed at serving the needs of the consumer. As such, its products have been tailor-made to suit the lifestyle of its subscriber base. The brand provides mobile phones, the latest being the Panalo Phone 2, which comes packaged with a Talk 'N Text SIM. The brand also provides individual SIMs capable of saving 450 phone numbers, stores 90 inbox text messages, comes with pre-loaded offers and pre-activated and ready-to-use when loading either via prepaid card or outlet.

The brand has ventured into landline units dubbed 'Barangay Phone' which essentially is a wireless handset which can be used to text mobile phones and call anywhere in the Philippines. Such units are aimed specifically for households where mobile phones may be in the hands of only one or two members of the family. It has also been used as a community phone in centers.

The brand sells ticket loads which by far may be the cheapest form of load card the brand offers. Priced at P10 it was designed to be highly accessible and may function as emergency load. Rates include P10 valid for 3 days, P15 valid for 15 days and P30 valid for 15 days.

Slogans
 Yan ang Galing without Overspending (2000–2005)
 Gumagaan ang Life! (2006‒2010)
 Tipid-Sulit Together! (2010‒2011)
 Araw-Araw Panalo! (May 2012–June 2016)
 It's a Tropa Thing! (June 2016–2020)
 Nasa Saya Yan! (2020–2022)
 Tuloy ang Saya! (2022–present)

See also
TNT Tropang Giga, a Philippine Basketball Association team sponsored by this company.
TM, TNT's main competitor

References

External links
TNT Facebook page
TNT Promo

Smart Communications
Mobile phone companies of the Philippines
Philippine companies established in 2000
Telecommunications companies established in 2000
Mobile virtual network operators
Philippine brands
2000 establishments in the Philippines